Mansfield St. Peter's High School is a private, Catholic, co-educational secondary school located in Mansfield, Ohio, United States. It is part of the Roman Catholic Diocese of Toledo.

Ohio High School Athletic Association state championships

 Boys Basketball – 1968, 1978 
 Girls Basketball – 1980 

The St. Peter's Spartans compete in the Mid-Buckeye Conference, since the 2013–2014 school year started.

Notable alumni
Richard "Rick" Nesta, 1966.  One of the guitar players for The Music Explosion.

References

External links
 School Website 

Catholic secondary schools in Ohio
Buildings and structures in Mansfield, Ohio
High schools in Richland County, Ohio
Educational institutions established in 1868
1868 establishments in Ohio